I Need a Man Like You to Make My Dreams Come True is a Canadian short film, directed by Kalli Paakspuu and Daria Stermac and released in 1986. Mixing performance art segments by Sheila Costick and Helen Porter with musical comedy interludes performed by The Clichettes (Louise Garfield, Janice Hladki and Johanna Householder), the film presents a satirical look at gender roles.

The film won the Genie Award for Best Live Action Short Drama at the 8th Genie Awards.

References

External links
 

1986 films
1986 comedy films
1986 short films
Best Live Action Short Drama Genie and Canadian Screen Award winners
1980s English-language films
Canadian comedy short films
1980s Canadian films